Barra Futebol Clube, usually known as Barra or Barra-SC, is a Brazilian football club from Balneário Camboriú, Santa Catarina.

The club is mainly notable due to holding the federative rights of some players, like Yann Rolim, Guilherme Biteco and deceased Matheus Biteco.

History
Founded in 2013 by a number of businessmen, Barra only played in the lower divisions of the Campeonato Catarinense. In their first division, the club suffered relegation from the Série B, and only returned to the category in 2016, after winning the previous year's Série C unbeaten.

From 2016 onwards, Barra achieved mid-table positions in the second level.

Honours
Campeonato Catarinense Série C: 2015

External links
 
Soccerway team profile

Association football clubs established in 2013
2013 establishments in Brazil
Football clubs in Santa Catarina (state)